Kaikaram railway station (station code:KKRM), is an Indian Railways station in Kaikaram village of Andhra Pradesh. It lies on the Vijayawada–Nidadavolu loop line of Howrah–Chennai main line and is administered under Vijayawada railway division of South Central Railway zone. Nine trains stop at this station every day.

History 
The southern part of the East Coast State Railway (from Waltair to Vijayawada) was taken over by Madras Railway in 1901.

References

External links 
South Central Railway

Railway stations in West Godavari district
Vijayawada railway division
Railway stations in India opened in 1893